In Our Bones is the debut studio album by American pop rock band Against the Current. The album was released on May 20, 2016.

Tour 

The In Our Bones World Tour was officially announced though the band's Facebook, Instagram, Twitter, also the band's official website and the band's YouTube channel. It began on September 6, 2016 in Seoul, South Korea the tour continued throughout Asia, Europe and North America. The tour concluded on October 18, 2017 in Buenos Aires, Argentina.

Track listing

Personnel

Against the Current
Chrissy Costanza – lead vocals, songwriting
Dan Gow – lead guitar, rhythm guitar, bass guitar, backing vocals, songwriting
Will Ferri – drums, keyboards, piano, backing vocals, songwriting

Additional musicians
Steve Aiello – piano and background vocals (on "Brighter")
Jake Haskell – additional bass guitar, songwriting

Production
Tommy English – production
Andrew Goldstein – co-production on Wasteland
Matt Dougherty – engineering
Neal Avron – mixing
Scott Skrzynski – mixing assistant

Chart performance
In Our Bones charted at number 181 on the US Billboard 200 chart, at number 15 on the US Top Alternative Albums, and at number 20 on the US Top Rock Albums. In the UK, the album charted at number 28 on the top albums chart. Internationally, the album has also charted in Austria, Belgium, Canada, France, Germany, and Switzerland.

Charts

References

2016 debut albums
Fueled by Ramen albums
Against the Current (band) albums